Crambus sparselloides is a moth in the family Crambidae. It was described by Graziano Bassi in 1986. It is found in Cameroon, Kenya and Uganda.

References

Crambini
Moths described in 1986
Moths of Africa